"Shades of Grey" is a single recorded by British singer Delilah. The song was released as a digital download single on 18 December 2011 in the United Kingdom as the fifth single from her debut album, From the Roots Up. The song was written and produced by Paloma Ayana and Reginald Perry.

Music video
A music video to accompany the release of "Shades of Grey" was first released onto YouTube on 20 August 2012 at a total length of four minutes. As of October 2016, the video has received over 1.47 million views.

Track listing

Chart performance

Release history

References

2012 singles
Delilah (musician) songs
2011 songs
Songs written by Delilah (musician)
Songs written by Syience
Warner Music Group singles